ʿAbbād ibn Bishr (c.597–632) was a companion of the Islamic prophet Muhammad. After the Hijrah of Muhammad and his followers from Mecca, Abbad and his clansmen were given name of Ansar for their assistance to gave shelter to the Muslims who came to their town. His Kunya or Teknonymy were Abu al-Rabi'.

Abbad ibn Bishr was known for his devotion to worship, knowledge and courage in battle. He was enthralled by the Qur'an after i  first hearing it recited by Musab ibn Umayr before the hijra when Abbad was about eighteen years old. The Qur'an had a special place in his heart, and he became renowned for his recitation so much so that he was known among the companions as the friend of the Qur'an.

Background 

Abbad ibn Bishr hailed from banu 'Abd al-Ash'al clan, a sub branch of Banu Aws, an immigrant clan came from Yemen which descended from Azd and settling in Yathrib, as they migrate from their homeland due to great flood in Yemen, before being renamed as Medina, around 300 AD. The Azdian Yathrib settler, which consisted of Aws and Banu Khazraj were widely known in Arabia before Islam as warlike peoples with full battle experiences,
particularly the Aws, which was deemed by historian as the more military minded of the two.

The Medinese, which consisted of Aws and Khazraj, along with their Jewish allies, Banu Nadir, Banu Qurayza, and Banu Qaynuqa, were involved in degenerating years of warfare such as battle of Sumair, battle of Banu Jahjaha of Aus-Banu Mazin of Khazraj, battle of Sararah day, battle of Banu Wa'il ibn Zayd, battle of Zhufr-Malik, battle of Fari', battle of Hathib, battle of Rabi' day, first battle of Fijar in Yathrib (not Fijar war between Qays with Kinana in Mecca), battle of Ma'is, battle of Mudharras. and second battle of Fijar in Yathrib. The Medinese also even contacted against foreign invaders came from outside Hejaz, including such as Shapur II of Sasanian Empire in relatively vague result, and also in successful defense against Himyarite Kingdom under their sovereign, Tabban Abu Karib, who also known as Dhu al-Adh'ar. However, the most terrible conflict for both Aws and Khazraj were a civil war called the battle of Bu'ath, which leave bitter taste for both clans, and caused them to grew weary of war, due to the exceptionally high level of violence, even by their standards, and the needless massacres that occurred during that battle.

Thus, in search of enlightenments and seeking arbitration from third party, the Yathribese then pledge their allegiance to Muhammad, a Qurayshite Meccan who preach new faith of Islam during the Medinese pilgrimage to Kaaba time. As Muhammad managed to convince many notables of both Aws and Khazraj, which also included Abbad ibn Bishr who personally convinced by a Muhajirun named Mus'ab ibn Umayr of his cause on his new faith, the chieftains of both Aws and Khazraj tribe, particularly Sa'd ibn Mu'adh, Usaid Bin Hudair, Saʽd ibn ʽUbadah, and As'ad ibn Zurara agreed to embrace Islam and appoint Muhammad as arbitrator and de facto leader of Medina. In no time, Abbad and other Yathribese agreed to provide shelter for Meccan Muslims who has been persecuted by Quraysh polytheists, while also agreeing to change their city name from Yathrib to Medina, as Yathrib has bad connotation in Arabic.

Biography 

As Abbad ibn Bishr embraced Islam and pledged his loyalty to Muhammad, he immediately instructed to be paired with one of Muhajirun as sworn brother, which is Abu Hudhayfa ibn Utba. Thus, Hereafter the arrival of Muslims of Mecca, Abbad served in various military campaign, where he along with other Ansaris and Muhajirun fought the first pitched battle were fought at the Battle of Badr in March 624. Later in the same year, after the Muslims defeated the Qaynuqa tribe in April as the Jewish tribe has been accused of treachery,

Approximately in the month of September, Muhammad ibn Maslamah were sent by Muhammad along with some of his kinsmen and allied tribe of Aws in a mission to assassinate Ka'b ibn al-Ashraf, one of Banu Nadir clansmen who conspired against Muhammad. Ibn Maslamah bring along some of his Aws clansmen including Abbad, and several other clan member that historically count as allies of Banu Aws, such as Banu Sulaym, Banu Mustaliq, and Banu Khuza'ah. Ibn Maslamah pretended to Ibn al-Ashraf that he needed a loan and offered to leave his weapons with him as security. Ibn al-Ashraf therefore came out to meet him and four others by night when they were fully armed, as Ka'b instructed the gate guards to allow Ibn Maslama and his colleagues to bring out the weapons. Then, as the unsuspecting Ka'b lowered his guard, The assassin group led by Ibn Maslama immediately struck him and killed him with their weapons, followed by Ibn Maslama, Abbad, and their colleagues managed to escape undetected within the night, as the tribes of Ka'b only learned the death of Ka'b on tomorrow, as they found the corpse of Ka'b lying on the ground.

In the year 625 (four years after hijra), The Muslims engaged in the expedition of Dhat al-Riqa as an effort of pre-emptive attack as Muhammad received news that the Ghatafan tribe in Najd were planning to attack Medina. In preemption, he assembled a detachment of over four hundred men including Abbad ibn Bishr. Arriving at Najd, they found the men of the tribes had fled to the hills. When the time of obligatory evening prayer came, Muhammad feared an ambush so he arranged the Muslims in ranks and divided them into two groups and performed salatul-khawf (emergency prayer of during conflict). As the Ghatafan witnessed the disciplined and vigilant rank of Muslim, they immediately cease their plan to attack the Muslims and stay at their position. After Muhammad saw the Ghatafan would not come down to face them, he immediately commanding the Muslims to depart. Then, as the Muslims packed their camp to return, Muhammad appointed Abbad ibn Bishr and Ammar ibn Yasir, whom Muhammad had paired as sworn-brothers, to patrol at night on the rear guard so they can alert the Muslims if there are any attempts from Ghatafan to ambush them during their departure. Thus, Ammar sleep a while and it is Abbad turn to stay on guard, Abbad performing night non-obligatory prayer to fill his duty time. Meanwhile, Abbad and Ammar were monitored by Ghatafan scout from afar, who in turn shooting his arrow to Abbad, who at that time were standing in his prayer. Ammar then wake up and terrified that he see Abbad were still standing in his prayer, while several arrows stucked on his body, while the Ghatafan scout has been away according to Abbad after he finished his prayer. Then both returned to Medina as the Muslim army have packed.

Later, Abbad were tasked by Muhammad to manage the massive spoils of war on the aftermath of the battle of Hunayn, which consisted tens of thousand of camels, sheep and goats, along with thousands Uqiyyah of gold ingots.

Abbad were involved in all military operations led by Muhammad and were tasked as Zakat collector for the tribe of Sulaym, Mustaliq, and Khuza'ah while not undergoing military operations.

Death 

Abbad was killed fighting the forces of Musailma at the battle of Yamamah in 632. Before the battle, he observed the lack of mutual confidence between the Muhajirin and Ansar, realized the campaign would fail unless they were separately regimented, and distinguished those who bore their responsibility and were steadfast in combat. When the battle commenced, Abbad ibn Bishr stood on a mound and shouted:

"O Ansar, distinguish yourselves among men. Destroy your scabbards. And do not forsake Islam."

Abbad gathered about four hundred men from the Ansar and launched an offensive into the enemy ranks, forcing their retreat to the garden of death, where Abbad ibn Bishr was mortally wounded. Although the battle was a victory for the Muslims, twelve hundred of their force were killed. So numerous were Abbad's wounds, that he was hardly recognizable. Although he passed at a young age, Abbad contributed much to the strength of the early Muslim community, and his life and martyrdom continue to inspire followers of Islam the world over.

Appraisal 

Aishah bint Abi Bakr, wife of Muhammad narrated a Hadith from her husband praising Abbad: "There are three persons among the Ansar whom no one could excel in virtue: Sa'd ibn Mu'adh, Usaid Bin Hudair, and Abbad ibn Bishr.", Rather, another narration tells "...Among the best ansar were banu Ash'al... and the best of banu Ash'al are Sa'd ibn Mu'adh, Usaid ibn Hudair, and Abbad ibn Bishr...".

In another narration, Anas ibn Malik said, "Usaid ibn Hudair and Abbad ibn Bishr were with the Prophet (Muhammad) [in his house]."

Abbad also mostly known for his narration of a purview hadith regarding the virtues of Medinese Ansaris During the aftermath of the battle of Hunayn, which solidified the Ansaris status in scholarly view. In the hadith, Muhammad has dubbed that loving and caring the Ansars and their descendants as a sign of faith, while disliking and not caring the Ansars and their descendants as a sign of Hypocrisy and faithless, thus prompting scholars of Islam, both classical and contemporary, to observe the context of this hadith that Ansaris relevance in Islam is a major section within Islam systemic belief, regardless the era.

References

Sources

See also
Salaf
As'ad ibn Zurara

Sahabah hadith narrators
Sahabah who participated in the battle of Badr
Year of birth unknown
632 deaths
Medieval Arabs killed in battle
Sahabah who participated in the battle of Uhud
Ansar (Islam)